"Never Too Late" is a song by Canadian pop punk group Hedley. It was released in April 2008 as the third single from their second album  Famous Last Words/Never Too Late. The US version of Famous Last Words is also called Never Too Late.

Music video
The music video for "Never Too Late" premiered in early April 2008, on MuchMusic/MuchMoreMusic. It is close to a shot-for-shot remake/parody of the music video that Duran Duran filmed for their 1982 single, "Rio".  Although the video is shorter and less elaborate than Duran Duran's, the premise is nearly identical.

Track listing

Charts

Year-end charts

References

2007 songs
2008 singles
Hedley (band) songs
Songs written by Jacob Hoggard
Universal Music Canada singles